The Tapps, later Tapps-Gervis, later Tapps-Gervis-Meyrick Baronetcy, of Hinton Admiral in the County of Hampshire, is a title in the Baronetage of Great Britain. It was created on 28 July 1791 for the landowner and developer George Tapps. The second Baronet sat as Member of Parliament for New Romney and Christchurch. He assumed in 1835 the additional surname of Gervis. The third Baronet was high sheriff of Anglesey in 1878. He assumed in 1876 by Royal licence the additional surname of Meyrick according to the will of Owen Fuller Meyrick, a relative on his mother's side, from whom he inherited the Bodorgan estate on the Isle of Anglesey. The fourth Baronet was high sheriff of Hampshire in 1900. The fifth Baronet was high sheriff of Anglesey in 1939.

The family seats are Hinton Admiral, near Bransgore, Hampshire, and Bodorgan Hall, Anglesey.

The Tapps Coat of Arms: Azure on a fess or between three rhinoceroses argent three escallops gules.

Tapps, later Tapps-Gervis, later Tapps-Gervis-Meyrick baronets, of Hinton Admiral 1791)
Sir George Ivison Tapps, 1st Baronet (1753–1835)
Sir George William Tapps-Gervis, 2nd Baronet (1795–1842)
Sir George Eliott Meyrick Tapps-Gervis-Meyrick, 3rd Baronet (1827–1896)
Sir George Augustus Eliott Tapps-Gervis-Meyrick, 4th Baronet (1855–1928)
Sir George Llewelyn Tapps-Gervis-Meyrick, 5th Baronet (1885–1960)
Sir George David Eliott Tapps-Gervis-Meyrick, 6th Baronet (1915–1988)
Sir George Christopher Cadfael Tapps-Gervis-Meyrick, 7th Baronet (1941–2019) married 1968, Jean Louise Montagu Douglas Scott (born 1943), niece of HRH Princess Alice, Duchess of Gloucester
Sir George William Owen Tapps-Gervis-Meyrick, 8th Baronet (born 1970)

The heir apparent is the present holder's son George Augustus Heilyn Tapps-Gervis-Meyrick (born 2011)

References

Baronetcies in the Baronetage of Great Britain
1791 establishments in Great Britain